was a Japanese samurai of the Sengoku period, who served the Oda clan. Nobuharu was the younger brother of Oda Nobunaga. Nobunaga granted him Nobu Castle and its surroundings as a private fief. While fighting the Asakura and Asai, Nobuharu was killed in battle at Usayama Castle (together with Mori Yoshinari, another Oda retainer) in Ōmi Province, in 1570.

Family
Father: Oda Nobuhide (1510–1551)
Brothers
Oda Nobuhiro (died 1574)
Oda Nobunaga (1534–1582)
Oda Nobuyuki (1536–1557)
Oda Nobukane (1548–1614)
Oda Nagamasu (1548–1622)
Oda Nobutoki (died 1556)
Oda Nobuoki  
Oda Hidetaka (died 1555)
Oda Hidenari
Oda Nobuteru
Oda Nagatoshi
Sisters:
Oichi (1547–1583)
Oinu

References
 http://www2s.biglobe.ne.jp/~gokuh/ghp/matsuei/tei_03.htm
 http://members2.tsukaeru.net/tono/b-oda%20kasinndann.html
 http://www2s.biglobe.ne.jp/~gokuh/ghp/buroku/oda_x1.htm
 http://www.page.sannet.ne.jp/gutoku2/odanobuharu.html

Samurai
1549 births
1570 deaths
Oda clan
Japanese warriors killed in battle